Rinsan is a county in North Hwanghae province, North Korea.

Administrative divisions
Rinsan county is divided into 1 ŭp (town) and 19 ri (villages):

References

Counties of North Hwanghae